Compsopogonophyceae is a class of red algae.

References

External links
 http://www.shigen.nig.ac.jp/algae_tree/CompsopogonophyceaeE.html

 
Red algae classes